Claude-Étienne Savary (1750 in Vitré, Ille-et-Vilaine – 1788) was an orientalist, pioneer of Egyptology and translator of the Qur'an.

Publications 
1782–1783: Le Coran, traduit de l'arabe, accompagné de notes, et précédé d'un abrégé de la vie de Mahomet, tiré des écrivains orientaux les plus estimés, Paris, Amsterdam, Leyde, etc. chez les libraires associés.
1784: Morale de Mahomet, ou Recueil des plus pures maximes du Quran, Goldschnitt, Paris, chez Lamy, Libraire, Quai des Augustins, Dresden, chez les Frères Walther, 1786 ; anthologie de passages du Coran compatibles avec la morale naturelle  ;
1788: Lettres sur la Grèce, faisant suite de celles de l'Égypte, Onfroy, Paris. Relation de voyage partant d'Alexandrie et concernant surtout les îles de Rhodes, Candie et la Crète.
 1785–1786: Lettres sur l'Égypte, où l'on offre le parallèle des mœurs anciennes & modernes de ses habitans, où l'on décrit l'état, le commerce, l'agriculture, le gouvernement, l'ancienne religion du pays, & la descente de S. Louis à Damiette, tirée de Joinville & des Auteurs Arabes. 1re édition, Onfroy, Paris. 2e édition, Amsterdam, Leyde, Rotterdam and Utrecht, 1787, 3e édition, Bleuet, 1798. The first two volumes are the account of his journey; the last is devoted to the study of religion and mythology, from the Arabic texts. These letters, addressed to his friend Lemonnier, first had a tremendous vogue and all newspapers gave them the highest praise;
1813: Grammaire de la langue arabe vulgaire et littérale; posthumous work extended with some Arab tales by the publisher, Paris, de l'Imprimerie Impériale.

1750 births
1788 deaths
People from Vitré, Ille-et-Vilaine
French orientalists
French travel writers
French Egyptologists
Translators of the Quran into French
French male non-fiction writers
18th-century translators